Delius is a surname. Notable people with the surname include: 

 Frederick Delius (1862–1934), English composer
 Friedrich Christian Delius (1943–2022), German writer
 Fritz Delius (1890–1966), German actor
 Ernst von Delius (1912–1937), German racing car driver
 Nicolaus Delius (1813–1888), German philologist
 Tobias Delius (born 1964), English jazz musician

Fictional characters:
Max Delius, fictional character in the 1992 novel The Discovery of Heaven

See also
 Deliu, another surname